Sorceress is the fourth studio album by American singer-songwriter Jess Williamson. It was released on May 15, 2020 under Mexican Summer.

Promotion

Singles
On February 26, 2020, Williamson announced the release of the album, alongside the first single "Wind on Tin". The second single, "Infinite Scroll" was released on March 31, 2020. On April 30, 2020, "Smoke" was the third single to be released by Williamson.

Critical reception
Sorceress was met with "generally favorable" reviews from critics. At Metacritic, which assigns a weighted average rating out of 100 to reviews from mainstream publications, this release received an average score of 74, based on 11 reviews.

Track listing

Charts

References

2020 albums
Mexican Summer albums